The Last Tango = Blues is an album by American trumpeter Blue Mitchell recorded in 1973 and released on the Mainstream label.

Reception
The Allmusic review by Jason Ankeny awarded the album 4 stars, stating: "The Last Tango = Blues translates the direct, soulful hard bop approach of Blue Mitchell's cult-classic Blue Note sessions into the funk-inspired grammar of mid-Seventies mainstream jazz... the performances are strictly next-level, complete with some of Mitchell's most fiery trumpet."

Track listing
 "Soul Turn Around" (Walter Bishop, Jr.) - 4:20 
 "Killing Me Softly With His Song" (Charles Fox, Norman Gimbel) - 2:53 
 "The Message" (Patrick Patterson, Steve Scipio) - 3:20 
 "Steal the Feel" (Richard Fritz) - 4:15 
 "Last Tango in Paris" (Gato Barbieri) - 2:42 
 "One for Russ" (Alf Clausen) - 4:15 
 "Peace" (Horace Silver) - 2:50 
 "P.T. Blues" (Blue Mitchell) - 3:04
Recorded in Los Angeles, California, in 1972.

Personnel
Blue Mitchell - trumpet
Jackie Kelso, Bill Perkins - flute, tenor saxophone
David Angel - clarinet, alto saxophone
Steve Kravitz - bass clarinet, baritone saxophone
Herman Riley - tenor saxophone
David T. Walker - guitar
Charles Kynard - organ
Darrell Clayborn, Chuck Rainey - electric bass
Raymond Pounds - drums
King Errisson, Paul Humphrey, Chino Valdes - percussion
Dick Fritz - arranger

References

Mainstream Records albums
Blue Mitchell albums
1973 albums
Albums produced by Bob Shad